Harold Thomas Brown (9 April 1924 – June 1982) was an English footballer who played as a goalkeeper for Queens Park Rangers, Notts County, Derby County and Plymouth Argyle.

He signed for Queens Park Rangers in 1940 and played during the war. He played for Colchester United while stationed at Colchester Garrison, making 12 Southern League appearances between October 1945 and April 1946. He also guested for Arsenal in a friendly against Dinamo Moscow in November 1945, alongside Stanley Matthews and Stan Mortensen. He later joined Notts County (1946–1949) and Derby County (1949–1951) before rejoining QPR in 1951. He went on to play 189 league games for Rangers.

Brown transferred to Plymouth Argyle in August 1956 and later had a spell with Exeter City.

References

1924 births
1982 deaths
Footballers from Kingsbury, London
English footballers
Association football goalkeepers
Queens Park Rangers F.C. players
Colchester United F.C. players
Arsenal F.C. wartime guest players
Notts County F.C. players
Derby County F.C. players
Plymouth Argyle F.C. players
Exeter City F.C. players

Southern Football League players
English Football League players
Brentford F.C. wartime guest players
Crystal Palace F.C. wartime guest players
British Army personnel of World War II